Maryland Million Distaff Handicap is an American Thoroughbred horse race held annually in October since 1986 primarily at Laurel Park Racecourse in Laurel, Maryland or at Pimlico Race Course in Baltimore. To be eligible for the Maryland Million Distaff Handicap, a filly or mare must be sired by a stallion who stands in Maryland. Due to that restriction the race is classified as a non-graded or "listed" stakes race and is not eligible for grading by the American Graded Stakes Committee.

The race is part of Maryland Million Day, a 12-race program held in mid October that was the creation of renowned television sports journalist Jim McKay. The "Maryland Million" is the first State-Bred showcase event ever created. Since 1986, 27 other events in 20 states have imitated the showcase and its structure.

From its inception in 1986 through 1992, 2001, 2002 and 2004 the race was run on dirt at a distance of six furlongs. Since 2004 it has been a 7 furlongs competition and currently offers a purse of $150,000.

In its 30th running in 2015, the race was restricted to those horses who were sired by a stallion who stands in the state of Maryland. Both the entrant horse and their stallion must be nominated to the Maryland Million program.

The race itself has had many titles since 1986 due in large part to the aggressive marketing efforts of Maryland Million Limited, the series' corporate founder. The race has been called many things starting from 1986 through 1988 and 1990 through 1992 it was known as the "State of Maryland Distaff Handicap." From 1993 through 1995 the race was called the "Port of Baltimore Distaff Handicap," from 1996 through 2001 the race was known as the "Maryland Department of Transportation Distaff Handicap." In 2002 the race was called the "Susquehanna Bank Disstaff Handicap," in 2006 it was known as the "Baltimore Examiner Distaff Handicap" and in 2007 the race was called the "Toyota Tundra Distaff Handicap."

Records 

Most wins horse:  
 3 - Safely Kept (1989, 1990, 1991)

Speed record: 
 7 furlongs: 1:22.73 - Willa On the Move (2003)
 6 furlongs: 1:10.00 - Safely Kept (1989)

Most wins by an owner:
 2 - Jayeff B Stable

Most wins by a jockey:
 3 - Mario Pino

Most wins by a trainer:
 3 - Alan E. Goldberg

Winners of the Maryland Million Distaff Handicap since 1986

See also 
 Maryland Million Distaff Handicap top three finishers
 Maryland Million Day
 Laurel Park Racecourse

References

 Maryland Thoroughbred official website

Horse races in Maryland
Recurring events established in 1986
Laurel Park Racecourse
Recurring sporting events established in 1986
1986 establishments in Maryland